The Ukrainian Cultural Centre of Toronto was located at  until the building was sold in 2015. (The Centre has relocated to the  Old Mill Hotel and Banquet complex since then).

"Christie", as the building was simply dubbed, was host to many Ukrainian events, and was the heart of the Ukrainian community in the Greater Toronto Area, bringing together people with a common culture and ideas.  The Centre was where the Ukrainian ancestral heritage was kept alive for several decades and also where English classes for newcomers and immigrants to Canada were offered. 

The Ukrainian Cultural Centre of Toronto consisted of a large and a small banquet hall, concert stage, full kitchen, rehearsal spaces, classrooms, library, cafeteria, "Trembita" nightclub, offices and a gymnasium. The Centre was home to the main offices of both the weekly Ukrainian language national newspaper HOMIN UKRAINY (Ukrainian Echo) and the Ukrainian Youth Association of Canada.  Both these institutions were founded in 1948 by Ukrainian immigrants to Canada.

From the 1970s, and through to the 1990s, the Centre was home to the Metro Toronto International Caravan Festival Ukrainian Pavilion, (originally as "Kiev," in honour of the Ukrainian national capital, then later "Lviv").

Before 1960, the building at 83 Christie St. was originally the home of the Toronto branch of the UJPO (United Jewish Peoples' Order). Currently the building is owned by the Philippine Jesus Is Lord Church.

References  

Ukrainian-Canadian culture in Ontario
Buildings and structures in Toronto
Community centres in Canada
Ukrainian cultural centres